Frans Van Hoorebeke (26 January 1908 – 10 July 1984) was a Belgian wrestler. He competed in the men's freestyle middleweight at the 1936 Summer Olympics.

References

1908 births
1984 deaths
Belgian male sport wrestlers
Olympic wrestlers of Belgium
Wrestlers at the 1936 Summer Olympics
Place of birth missing
20th-century Belgian people